Aniebo is a surname. Notable people with the surname include:

Augustine Aniebo (born 1950), Nigerian administrator
I. N. C. Aniebo (born 1939), Nigerian novelist